The Inheritance Games is a young adult novel series by Jennifer Lynn Barnes, published by Little, Brown Books for Young Readers. The series focuses on a girl named Avery Kylie Grambs, and the Hawthorne family. It currently consists of three books: The Inheritance Games (2020), The Hawthorne Legacy (2021), and The Final Gambit (2022). A standalone book that follows the events of the series is set to be released in 2023, The Brothers Hawthorne

The Inheritance Games 
The Inheritance Games was published September 1, 2020. It was a New York Times and IndieBound best seller.

The book received starred reviews from Publishers Weekly and Kirkus Reviews, as well as positive reviews from Booklist and School Library Journal and a mixed review from the Bulletin of the Center for Children's Books.

In 2021, the book won the Teen Buckeye Book Award and was nominated for the Edgar Award for Young Adult, the Goodreads Choice Award for Young Adult, and YALSA's Teen's Top Ten. It was also selected for YALSA's Quick Picks for Reluctant Young Adult Readers and Best Fiction for Young Adults and Kirkus Reviews' Best Books of 2020.

The Hawthorne Legacy 
The Hawthorne Legacy was published September 7, 2021.

The book received positive reviews from Kirkus Reviews and School Library Journal.

In 2021, it was a finalist for a Goodreads Choice Award for Young Adult Fiction.

The Final Gambit 
The Final Gambit was published August 30, 2022.

Accolades

References 

Little, Brown and Company books
Novels set in Texas
Book series introduced in 2020
2020s children's books